TSO may refer to:

Science and technology
 Technical Standard Order, a minimum performance standard issued by the FAA for certain items used on civil aircraft
 Transmission system operator, an entity involved in electric power transmission or transmission of natural gas
 Trichuris suis, a species of whipworm, a parasite of pigs

Computing
 TCP segmentation offloading, a technique for increasing outbound throughput of high-bandwidth network connections 
 Time Sharing Option, an interactive command line interpreter for IBM mainframe operating systems OS/360, SVS, MVS, OS/390 and z/OS
 Total store order, in microprocessor memory ordering

Music
 Taipei Symphony Orchestra
 Tasmanian Symphony Orchestra
 Tehran Symphony Orchestra
 The Summer Obsession
 Tokyo Symphony Orchestra
 Toledo Symphony Orchestra
 Toronto Symphony Orchestra
 Trans-Siberian Orchestra
 Tucson Symphony Orchestra

Transportation
 Transaero Airlines (ICAO airline designator code), a former Russian airline
 Tresco Heliport (IATA airport code), a former heliport in the Scilly islands
 Tourist Standard Open, a type of British Railways loco-hauled coach
 Trailer Standard Open, a type of British Railways coach
 Marcos TSO, a sports car manufactured by Marcos Engineering Ltd
 Transportation security officer, a federal employee of the Transportation Security Administration, a division of the U. S. Department of Homeland Security

Other uses
 Threefold social order, a sociological theory involving the relationship of economy, polity and culture
 The Sims Online, a massively multiplayer game
 The Stationery Office, a British publisher
 Total shares outstanding, the stock held by investors, including restricted shares, as well as those held by the public; see shares outstanding

See also
 Tso (disambiguation)